Siva Kumar, also known as Stun Siva is an Indian action choreographer in the Telugu film industry and also has worked in Tamil films. He started his career as an extra fighter and assistant to stunt masters including Kanal Kannan and Rambo Rajkumar, later he became as a stunt master and actor. Stunt masters including Anal Arasu, K. Ganesh Kumar, Silva, Besant Ravi, Anbariv, and Rajendran have worked as fighters and assistants to him. In 2014, he announced that he will be making his directorial debut with Karathe Karan, which is a remake of the 1984 film The Karate Kid. His son Kevin Kumar made his debut as stunt coordinator with Adanga Maru.

Filmography

As action director

 1997 Love Today
 1997 Pistha
 1997 Once More
 1997 Kadhalukku Mariyadhai
 1998 Ponmanam
 1998 Kannathal
 1998 Udhavikku Varalaamaa
 1998 Dhinamdhorum
 1998 Swarnamukhi
 1998 Velai
 1998 Thulli Thirindha Kaalam
 1998 Veera Thalattu
 1998 Iniyavale
 1998 En Uyir Nee Thaane
 1998 Simmarasi
 1998 Urimai Por
 1988 Pudhumai Pithan
 1998 Thalaimurai
 1999 Chinna Durai
 1999 Rajasthan
 1999 Sethu
 2000 Kannukkul Nilavu
 2000 Veeranadai
 2000 Unnai Kodu Ennai Tharuven
 2001 En Purushan Kuzhandhai Maadhiri
 2001 Vinnukkum Mannukkum
 2001 Nandha
 2002 Priyamaina Neeku
 2002 Punnagai Desam
 2002 Kamarasu
 2002 Album
 2002 Mounam Pesiyadhe
 2003 Chronic Bachelor (Malayalam)
 2003 Ice
 2003 Pithamagan
 2004 Arul
 2004 Perazhagan
 2005 Ponniyin Selvan
 2005 Thotti Jaya
 2006 Ajay (Kannada)
 2006 Vettaiyaadu Vilaiyaadu
 2006 Thalaimagan
 2007 Pachaikili Muthucharam
 2007 Thee Nagar
 2008 Twenty:20 (Malayalam)
 2008 Nepali
 2008 Vellithirai
 2008 Sakkarakatti
 2008 Aegan
 2008 Satyam
 2009 Muthirai
 2009 Vaamanan
 2010 Paappi Appacha (Malayalam)
 2010 Agam Puram
 2010 Siddhu +2
 2011 Kaavalan
 2014 Nimirndhu Nil
 2015 Sandamarutham
 2015 Valiyavan
 2015 Gabbar Is Back (Hindi)
 2016 Thodari
 2017 Indrajith
 2017 Masterpiece (Malayalam)
 2018 Imaikkaa Nodigal
 2018 Abrahaminte Santhathikal (Malayalam)
 2018 Adanga Maru
 2019 Kodathi Samaksham Balan Vakeel (Malayalam)
 2019 Kaaviyyan
 2020 Vettaiyan
 2021 Bhoomi
 2021 Kaadan
 2021 Akhanda (Telugu)
 2022 Ramarao on Duty (Telugu)
 2022 Naane Varuven
 2022 Rudhran
 2022 Viduthalai
 2023 Jailer

As actor
 1989 Anbu Kattalai as Henchman
 1990 Jagathalaprathapan as Henchman
 1992  Chinna Poovai Killathe as Rogue
 1994 Thozhar Pandian as Pickpocket
 1997 Pistha as Henchman
 2000 Kannukkul Nilavu as Henchman
 2001 Vinnukkum Mannukkum as Henchman
 2002 Punnagai Desam as Chain Snatcher
 2002 Album as Karikkol
 2003 Pithamagan as Police Inspector
 2006 Vettaiyaadu Vilaiyaadu as Royapuram Mani
 2016 Theri as Karikalan
 2018 Goli Soda 2 as Seemai Raja
 2019 Champion as Dhanasekar
 2021 Krack as Ankudu
 2021 Eeswaran as Rathnasamy

Awards and nominations
Won
 2000 Tamil Nadu State Film Award for Best Stunt Coordinator - Kannukkul Nilavu
 2008 - IIFA Award for Best Action
 2019 - Ananda Vikatan Award for Best Villain – Male - Champion
Nominated
 2018 Norway Tamil Film Festival Award for Best Stunt Choreographer - Adanga Maru

References

External links

Indian male film actors
Tamil male actors
Indian action choreographers
Male actors from Chennai
Film directors from Chennai
20th-century Indian male actors
21st-century Indian male actors
1968 births
Living people
Male actors in Telugu cinema